SMK Takis Papar also known as Sekolah Menengah Kebangsaan Takis Papar (SMKTP) in Malay, is a Malaysian secondary school located in East Malaysia at Papar district. This school was established in 2001.

History
SMK Takis is the seventh school was built at the Papar District. The school was built on ten acres of land area and SMK Takis name was chosen because it coincided with the location of the village Takis, Papar. The construction took more than a year starting from July 1999 and completed in January 2001. The intake of students in the first place on 29 and 30 February 2001.

Initially a total of 38 trainers who have been placed at SMK Takis. Over 90% of the number of teachers are graduate teachers in various fields. In other words, SMK Takis capable of providing the various fields of knowledge to the students whether in the form of science and technology, vocational skills and arts and language consistent with the knowledge / expertise possessed by the teachers.

SMK Takis has 40 classrooms which can accommodate between 30 and 40 students. In addition there are various facilities such as Life Skills Workshop, Resource Centre, Computer Lab and other facilities are also available. In terms of area and place, the school is able to accommodate more than a thousand people in a school.

In 2006, SMK Takis has offered a Vocational subjects of Interior to give exposure to students on how to decorate the house building. This subject has offer to students in Form 4 and 5.

List of Principals

External links

References

Secondary schools in Malaysia
Schools in Sabah